Red Rain may refer to:

 Blood rain, red precipitation that resembles blood
 Red rain in Kerala, a phenomenon observed sporadically during the summers in the southern Indian state

Books and film
 Batman & Dracula: Red Rain, a comic book from DC Comics
 Red Rain (novel), a 2012 horror novel by R. L. Stine
 Red Rain (film), a 2013 Malayalam science fiction thriller

Music
 Red Rain (album), an album by Dice
 "Red Rain" (song), a song by Peter Gabriel
 "Red Rain," a song by The White Stripes on their album Get Behind Me Satan
 "Red Rain", a song by the Power Metal band Primal Fear on their album Nuclear Fire

See also
 Blood rain (disambiguation)